Charles Walter Radclyffe (17 January 1817 – 2 February 1903) was a British watercolourist, printmaker and lithographer. The son of artist William Radclyffe (1783–1855), he was elected into the Birmingham Society of Artists in 1846.

Radclyffe was a key part of Birmingham Art Societies, exhibiting 454 works between 1846 and 1902. His work was mostly typographical landscapes and urban scenes, including his works for Perry Hall and Blenheim Palace in the mid-1800s.

References

External links 

 
Charles W Radclyffe (32 engravings) at rareoldprints.com site
 Lithographs of Perry Hall (named as "Perry Barr Hall"), in the collection of Birmingham Museums Trust

1817 births
1903 deaths
19th-century English painters
English male painters
20th-century English painters
English watercolourists
Members and Associates of the Royal Birmingham Society of Artists
English lithographers
20th-century British printmakers
Artists from Birmingham, West Midlands
19th-century English male artists
20th-century English male artists
20th-century lithographers